Washington Place is a Greek Revival palace in the Hawaii Capital Historic District in Honolulu, Hawaii. It was where Queen Liliuokalani was arrested during the overthrow of the Hawaiian Kingdom. Later it became the official residence of the governor of Hawaii. In 2007, it was designated as a National Historic Landmark. The current governor's residence was built in 2008 behind the historic residence, and is located on the same grounds as Washington Place.

Construction

An American merchant sea captain, John Dominis (1796–1846) came to America in 1819 from Trieste, probably from a Croatian family.  After making a number of voyages across the Pacific, he relocated to the islands in 1837 with his Bostonian wife Mary Jones Dominis (1803–1889) and son John Owen Dominis (1832–1891) from New York. The captain was awarded some land in 1842 as settlement of a lawsuit with the British Consul Richard Charlton. The captain continued to take voyages to raise money for the construction of a house. In 1846 he sailed for China on the Brig William Neilson, intending to purchase Chinese-made furniture for the house, which was nearing completion. The ship was lost at sea, along with the American Agent George Brown, and Mary Dominis became a widow. She rented out a suite of rooms to support herself and young John Owen. One of the first boarders was Anthony Ten Eyck, an American Commissioner to the islands appointed by President James K. Polk who established the American Legation in the house. Ten Eyck named the house "Washington Place" in a February 22, 1848 letter, after George Washington in celebration of the first US president's birthday. King Kamehameha III officially approved the name.

The American flag was raised at the residence until Mary Dominis's death in 1889 when Liliuokalani had it removed. In 1917, Liliuokalani raised the American flag at Washington Place in honor of five Hawaiian sailors who had perished in the sinking of the SS Aztec by German submarines. Her act was interpreted by many as her symbolic support of the United States.

The building was designed by the master carpenter Isaac Hart, who had helped build the first Iolani Palace. The building was also constructed by Daniel Jenner, an Italian master mason. The interior was originally finished by the master painter Israel Wright. Native Hawaiians were also involved with the construction of the building, but are not named individually by the archival records. Washington Place was constructed with "open lānais" on all sides.

The foundation of the building, the lower level walls and the lower columns are constructed of coral stone. The upper floor is of wood-frame construction. Washington Place conforms to period French Creole Greek Revival houses that were built along the lower Gulf-Coastal region of the southeastern United States. The home was constructed with an almost square core surrounded by a peristyle, a two tiered verandah, Tuscan columns on its upper floor, and a hipped roof. The interior of the home is arranged in a traditional Georgian floor plan, with four distinct parlors on the first floor and four bedchambers on the second floor.

History

William Little Lee made Washington Place his home from 1849–1854. Lee was instrumental in integrating a Western legal system in the Hawaiian Islands, based upon the Massachusetts model. Lee also authored the Great Mahele, which introduced private land ownership into Hawaiian culture.

Lydia Kamakaeha Pākī, the future Queen Liliuokalani and the Heir Apparent to the throne of the Kingdom of Hawaii, married John Owen Dominis in 1862, making Washington Place the private residence of the princess and future queen. Another Massachusetts lawyer, Alfred S. Hartwell, rented a guest room from 1868 until 1872. He describes Mary as still expecting her husband to return any day.
Mary Dominis died on April 25, 1889, and John Owen Dominis died on August 27, 1891, leaving the property to Liliuokalani, who had just become Queen after the death of her brother, King Kalākaua.

Arrest of the Queen
During 1893, Washington Place was the site of the dramatic events of the overthrow of the Hawaiian Kingdom. It was there that the queen was arrested by the new governmental forces that were aided by a detachment of United States Marines. The queen was tried before a military tribunal, where she was charged with concealment of treason against the new government, the Republic of Hawaii. She was convicted and was confined for several months at Washington Place after her release from imprisonment at Iolani Palace.

Queen Liliuokalani resided at Washington Place for the remainder of her life. She died in the downstairs bedroom of the house on November 11, 1917. The home offers the citizens of Hawaii a strong sense of place and belonging in association with the kingdom and of Queen Liliuokalani's memory.

Executive Mansion
In her book, Hawaii's Story by Hawaii's Queen, Liliuokalani described the building as "a palatial dwelling" and a "choice tropical retreat in the midst of the chief city of the Hawaiian islands."

On May 14, 1921, the territorial legislature of Hawaii purchased Washington Place for $55,000 from the estate of Queen Liliuokalani to serve as the Executive Mansion of the Territorial Governor of Hawaii. It was remodeled in 1922 by Governor Wallace Rider Farrington. In all, it was the residence of twelve territorial and state governors of Hawaii. Technically, it was the residence of thirteen governors, because John Owen Dominis, Liliuokalani's consort, had been Governor of the island of Oahu from 1868 to 1891. The house served in this role until 2002, when it was converted into a historic house museum. It was listed on the National Register of Historic Places on June 18, 1973, and was designated a National Historic Landmark on March 29, 2007.

In 2008 a new governor's residence was built behind the historic Washington Place, within its grounds, and continues to serve the same purpose.

Gallery

See also

List of governors of Hawaii

References

 Ariyoshi, Jean Hayashi, Washington Place, A First Lady's Story, Honolulu, Japanese Cultural Center of Hawaii, 2004.

Further reading

External links

Royal residences in Hawaii
Houses completed in 1847
Historic house museums in Hawaii
Governors' mansions in the United States
Houses in Honolulu County, Hawaii
National Historic Landmarks in Hawaii
Greek Revival houses in Hawaii
Museums in Honolulu
Government buildings in Hawaii
Historic American Buildings Survey in Hawaii
1847 establishments in Hawaii
National Register of Historic Places in Honolulu
Native Hawaiian culture in Honolulu
Governor of Hawaii